Wetmorena haetiana, the Hispaniolan earless galliwasp or earless galliwasp, is an endangered  species of lizard of the Diploglossidae family endemic to the Caribbean island of Hispaniola (in the Dominican Republic and Haiti).

Taxonomy
It was formerly classified in the genus Celestus, but was moved back to Wetmorena in 2021.

References

Wetmorena
Reptiles described in 1927
Endemic fauna of Hispaniola
Reptiles of the Dominican Republic
Reptiles of Haiti
Taxa named by Doris Mable Cochran